The Myanmar Standard Bible (MSB) is an upcoming translation of the Bible in Myanmar language produced by Global Bible Initiative (formerly Asia Bible Society) using translation tools developed by GBI. The project was started in January 2007.

The translation of the New Testament was completed in December 2013, and the dedication ceremony was celebrated at Judson Church in Yangon, Myanmar, on 25 January 2014, with more than 200 attendees from leaders and pastors from various Christian churches and organizations. The translation of the Old Testament is currently still in progress. Recently the Book of Psalms, Book of Proverbs and Ecclesiastes were released in electronic versions such as YouVersion app and Myanmar Standard Bible app for Android on the Google Play Store, both in Zawgyi font and Unicode formats. The whole Bible is scheduled to be completed in 2022.

Printed editions
 Myanmar Standard Bible /Judson Bible Parallel New Testament 2013, 2015. Myanmar Standard Bible New Testament special edition 2016.

See also
 Bible translations into Burmese

References

Bible versions and translations
Burmese-language books
Christianity in Myanmar